Piața Romană (The Roman Square) is a major traffic intersection in Sector 1, central Bucharest. 

Two major boulevards intersect in Piața Romană: Lascăr Catargiu Boulevard (which runs northwest towards Piața Victoriei) and Magheru Boulevard (which runs south by southeast towards University Square). The two roads also coincide geographically with the Bucharest Metro Line M2. The square is served by the Piața Romană metro station, on Magheru Boulevard. Dacia Boulevard runs roughly east–west through the square. 

Between 1997 and 2010, Piața Romană featured a Capitoline Wolf statue, a symbol of Latinity (see also the Capitoline Wolf Statue in Cluj-Napoca). The statue was since relocated to I.C. Brătianu Boulevard.

The main building of the Academy of Economic Studies is located to the north of the square.

External links
 Piaţa Romană live webcam

Romana